Patriarch Gregory IV may refer to:

 Patriarch Gregory IV of Alexandria, Greek Patriarch of Alexandria in 1398–1412
 Gregory IV of Constantinople, Ecumenical Patriarch of Constantinople in 1623
 Gregory IV of Antioch (1859–1928), Greek Orthodox Patriarch of Antioch 1906–1928